Eugen Meier (30 April 1930 – 26 March 2002) was a Swiss footballer who played as a forward.

During his club career he played for FC Schaffhausen and BSC Young Boys. He earned 42 caps and scored three goals for the Switzerland national team from 1953 to 1962, and participated in the 1954 FIFA World Cup and the 1962 FIFA World Cup.

References

External links
 
 
 

1930 births
2002 deaths
People from Schaffhausen
Sportspeople from the canton of Schaffhausen
Swiss men's footballers
Association football forwards
Switzerland international footballers
1954 FIFA World Cup players
1962 FIFA World Cup players
FC Schaffhausen players
BSC Young Boys players
FC Bern players